Windebyer Noor is a lake in Kreis Rendsburg-Eckernförde, Schleswig-Holstein, Germany. At an elevation of 0 m, its surface area is 389.3 ha. The lake belongs to Eckernförde.

Lakes of Schleswig-Holstein
Rendsburg-Eckernförde